Love is the second and final studio album from DramaGods, a project led by guitarist Nuno Bettencourt. Bettencourt is most remembered for being the guitarist in the band Extreme. Originally conceived as a double-album entitled "Love/Hate", the songs were combined into one album. It is not known what happened to the rest of the songs from these recording sessions, if they were ever fully recorded and produced, or just left as demos.

The album was originally released by JVC Victor in Japan and is the first released by the band under the name DramaGods. The band was previously known as Population 1, but changed the name due to legal issues.

The song 'Interface' was later re-recorded for Extreme's album Saudades de Rock.

Track listing

 Megaton (Bettencourt, Pessia, Ferlazzo, Figueiredo)
 Lockdown (Bettencourt)
 Bury You (Bettencourt, Burns)
 Broken (Bettencourt)
 Pilots (Bettencourt, Figueiredo, Pessia)
 Interface (Bettencourt)
 Heavy (Bettencourt, Pessia, Ferlazzo, Figueiredo)
 Something About You (Bettencourt)
 Fearless Leader (Bettencourt, Pessia)
 Sometimes (Bettencourt, Ferlazzo, Figueiredo, Pessia)
 So'k (Bettencourt, Figueiredo)
 Replay (Bettencourt, Pessia)
 Nice To Meet You (Bettencourt)
 Sky (Be)

Personnel
Nuno Bettencourt — guitars, lead vocals; bass (tracks 4, 12) 
Steve Ferlazzo — keyboards, backing vocals
Joe Pessia — bass (tracks 1-3, 5-11, 13, 14); mandolin (track 4), slide guitar (track 4), guitar (track 12) 
Kevin Figuereido — drums, backing vocals

See also
 Nuno Bettencourt
 Mourning Widows
 Extreme

References

Nuno Bettencourt albums
2005 albums